Mariella Gable, OSB (1898–1985) was an American academic, writer, and literary critic.

Early life and education
Gable was born Mary Margaret Gable in Wisconsin, and received the name "Mariella" when she entered the Order of Saint Benedict at Saint Benedict's Monastery in St. Joseph, Minnesota, in 1916.

Career
In 1934 she received her PhD from Cornell University, and took a position as chair of the Department of English at the College of Saint Benedict, where she remained until 1958. She was the editor of several anthologies of short stories, including Great Modern Catholic Short Stories (1942), Our Father's House (1945), and Many-Colored Fleece (1950), and wrote numerous essays as well; as a result she played a large role in shaping mid-century opinions of Catholic fiction in the United States and in Europe. She felt that fiction about religious and moral subjects should possess literary value, not merely serve as sentiment.

Among authors whose work she respected were J. F. Powers and Flannery O'Connor; She also introduced such writers as Frank O'Connor, Sean O'Faolain, Mary Lavin, and Bryan MacMahon to American audiences. Gable remained on the faculty of the College of Saint Benedict until 1973. She is honored on campus with a residence hall and a literary prize, both named in her honor.

References

External links 

 Saint Benedict's Monastery Archives

1898 births
1985 deaths
20th-century American women writers
20th-century American non-fiction writers
American women non-fiction writers
American literary critics
Women literary critics
American academics of English literature
American Benedictines
20th-century American Roman Catholic nuns
Cornell University alumni
College of Saint Benedict and Saint John's University faculty
Writers from Wisconsin
American literary editors
American women academics
American women critics